Samar Deb (born 1 November 1963) is an Indian Bengali writer and poet. He was born at Coochbehar, West Bengal. He is the youngest child of Satish Chandra Deb and Sabita Deb.

He is most known for his classic novel, Lohitparer Upakatha (2010).

List of major works 

 Yayati – A Collection of Poems (Published – 1986)
 Ek Yug Atmapratarana – Novel (Published – 2003)
 Amma Tera Munda – A Collection of Poems (Published – 2004)
 Ekti Golper Suluk Sandhan (Novel) (Published – 2006)
 Aalo Andhakar – A Collection of Poems (Published – 2006)
 Lohitparer Upakatha – Novel(Published – 2010)
 Neel Andhakar – Novel (Published – 2012)
 Amrita Jatra – Collection of Essays (Published – 2016)

References 

1963 births
Bengali writers
People from Cooch Behar district
Living people